Maria Marello (born 11 March 1961) is a retired Italian discus thrower. She is the coach of the Italian female discus thrower Daisy Osakue, and javelin thrower Zahra Bani.

Biography
She won the gold medal at the 1987 Mediterranean Games and finished fifth at the 1991 Mediterranean Games. She also competed at the 1987 World Championships without reaching the final.

Marello became Italian champion twice, in 1987 and 1988. Her personal best time was 57.54 metres, achieved in June 1986 in Verona.

References

External links
 
 Maria Marello at All-Athletics

1961 births
Living people
Italian female discus throwers
World Athletics Championships athletes for Italy
Mediterranean Games gold medalists for Italy
Mediterranean Games medalists in athletics
Athletes (track and field) at the 1987 Mediterranean Games
Athletes (track and field) at the 1991 Mediterranean Games